The Prehistory Museum (Musée de la préhistoire) in Echternach, Luxembourg, houses a collection of prehistoric artefacts principally from Luxembourg, northern Europe and France testifying to the history of mankind for more than a million years. It is located in the 15th century Hihof building in the centre of the town.

The Hihof

The Gothic Hihof building is adjacent to the church of Peter and Paul on the corner of the Rue du Pont. At the beginning of the 19th century, it housed the local grammar school. The museum was inaugurated in 1984.

The collection

The stoneage artefacts displayed in some 30 showcases include chopping tools, arrow tips, axes, daggers and grinding stones. There are explanations of how the tools were produced and used in practice. Some of the tools are from as far afield as North America, Africa and Papua and New Guinea. Life in the various prehistoric periods is illustrated with prehistoric skulls and reconstructions of old machines for sawing, weaving and threshing. There are also a number of video presentations.

Opening hours

From 1 April to 15 November, the museum is open from 10 am to 12 noon and from 2 pm to 5 pm every day except Mondays. In July and August, it is open from 10 am to 5 pm without a break.

See also
 List of museums in Luxembourg

External links
Musée de la préhistoire website

References

Museums in Luxembourg
Tourist attractions in Luxembourg
Echternach
Museums established in 1984